The India Gate (formerly known as the All India War Memorial) is a war memorial located near the Kartavya path on the eastern edge of the "ceremonial axis" of New Delhi, formerly called duty path. It stands as a memorial to 84,000 soldiers of the British Indian Army who died between 1914 and 1921 in the First World War, in France, Flanders, Mesopotamia, Persia, East Africa, Gallipoli and elsewhere in the Near and the Far East, and the Third Anglo-Afghan War. 13,300 servicemen's names, including some soldiers and officers from the United Kingdom, are inscribed on the gate. Designed by Sir Edwin Lutyens, the gate evokes the architectural style of the memorial arch such as the Arch of Constantine, in Rome, and is often compared to the Arc de Triomphe in Paris, and the Gateway of India in Mumbai.

Following the Bangladesh Liberation war in 1972, a structure consisting of a black marble plinth with a reversed rifle, capped by a war helmet and bounded by four eternal flames, was built beneath the archway. This structure, called Amar Jawan Jyoti (Flame of the Immortal Soldier), has since 1971 served as India's tomb of the unknown soldier. India Gate is counted amongst the largest war memorials in India and every Republic Day, the Prime Minister visits the gate to pay their tributes to the Amar Jawan Jyoti, following which the Republic Day parade starts. India Gate is often a location for civil society protests.

India Gate 

The India Gate was part of the work of the Imperial War Graves Commission (IWGC), which came into existence in December 1918 under the British rule for building war graves and memorials to soldiers who were killed in the First World War. The foundation stone of the gate then called the All India War Memorial, was laid on 10 February 1921, at 16:30, by the visiting Duke of Connaught in a ceremony attended by officers and men of the British Indian Army, Imperial Service Troops, the commander in chief, and Chelmsford, the viceroy. On the occasion, the viceroy is reported to have said, "The stirring tales of individual heroism, will live forever in the annals of this country", and that the memorial which was a tribute to the memory of heroes, "known and unknown", would inspire future generations to endure hardships with similar fortitude and "no less valor". The Duke also read out a message by the King, which said, "On this spot, in the central vista of the Capital of India, there will stand a Memorial Archway, designed to keep", in the thoughts of future generations, "the glorious sacrifice of the officers and men of the British Indian Army who fought and fell". During the ceremony, the Deccan Horse, 3rd Sappers and Miners, 6th Jat Light Infantry, 34th Sikh Pioneers, 39th Garhwal Rifles, 59th Scinde Rifles (Frontier Force), 117th Mahrattas, and 5th Gurkha Rifles 

Ten years after the foundation stone's laying on 12 February 1931, the memorial was inaugurated by Lord Irwin, who, on the occasion, said "those who after us shall look upon this monument may learn in pondering its purpose something of that sacrifice and service which the names upon its walls record." In the decade between the laying of foundation stone of the memorial and its inauguration, the rail-line was shifted to run along the Yamuna River, and the New Delhi Railway Station was opened in 1926.

The gate, which is illuminated every evening from 19:00 to 21:30, today serves as one of Delhi's most important tourist attractions. Cars used to travel through the gate until it was closed to traffic. The Republic Day Parade starts from Rashtrapati Bhavan and passes around the India Gate. India gate is often a location for civil society protests, including demonstrations in response to the Nirbhaya rape case in 2012 and the Unnao rape case in 2017, and as part of the 2011 anti-corruption movement.

In 2017, the India Gate was twinned with the Arch of Remembrance in Leicester, England, another Lutyens war memorial, following a very similar design but on a smaller scale. In a ceremony, India's high commissioner to the United Kingdom laid a wreath at the arch in Leicester and the British high commissioner to India laid one at the India Gate.

Design and structure 

The memorial gate was designed by Sir Edwin Lutyens, who was not only the main architect of New Delhi but also a member of the Imperial War Graves Commission and one of Europe's foremost designers of war graves and memorials. He designed sixty-six war memorials in Europe, including the highly regarded  Cenotaph in London in 1919, the first national war memorial erected after World War I, for which he was commissioned by David Lloyd George, the British prime minister. The memorial in New Delhi, like the Cenotaph in London, is a secular memorial, free of religious and "culturally-specific iconography such as crosses". Lutyens according to his biographer, Christopher Hussey, relied on the "elemental mode", a style of commemoration based on a "universal architectural style free of religious ornamentation".

The  India Gate stands on a low base of red Bharatpur stone and rises in stages to a huge moulding. The shallow domed bowl at the top was intended to be filled with burning oil on anniversaries, but this is rarely done.

Inscriptions 
The cornice of the India Gate is inscribed with Imperial suns while both sides of the arch have INDIA, flanked by the dates MCMXIV ('1914'; on the left) and MCMXIX ('1919'; on the right). Below the word INDIA, in capital letters, is inscribed:

13,313 names are engraved out of which 12,357 are Indian. Access to read the names on the memorial is restricted, though they can be seen on the Commonwealth War Graves Commission (CWGC) website, which lists the names with their respective date of death, unit name, regiment, place on gate where name is inscribed, location, and other information).

Canopy 

Lutyens used four Delhi Order columns to support the domed canopy and its chhajja.

Statue of King-Emperor George V 
In the autumn of 1930, Jagatjit Singh, the Maharaja of Kapurthala State, organized an appeal amongst the Indian princely rulers to erect a statue of King-Emperor George V in New Delhi to commemorate the sovereign's recent recovery from sepsis. As originally conceived, the statue would have depicted the monarch in marble riding in a howdah atop a red stone elephant; a canopy was not then included in the design. The canopy was topped by a gilded Tudor Crown and bore the Royal Cyphers of George V, with the completed monument intended to "mark the loyalty and attachment of the Ruling Princes and Chiefs of India to the Person and Throne of the King-Emperor." Following the premature death of Jagger, the statue's head and crown were completed by one of his assistants in England and then shipped to India, while the remainder of the monument was carved in India.

The statue's installation in the autumn of 1936, amidst the Indian independence movement, made it a target for Independence activists; on the night of 3 January 1943, during the Quit India movement, Hemwati Nandan Bahuguna and Manubhai Shah scaled the statue, smashed its nose and draped it with a large black cloth inscribed "Death to the Tyrant." The statue remained standing at its original site for two decades following the nation's independence in 1947, but certain political factions increasingly objected to its continued presence in its central location, particularly after the tenth anniversary of Independence and the centennial of the Indian Rebellion of 1857. On the night of 12–13 August 1958, the royal insignia of George V and the Tudor Crown atop the canopy were removed.

With increasing pressure from Socialist members of Parliament, then-Deputy Minister Home Affairs Lalit Narayan Mishra stated in May 1964 that all British statuary would be removed from the national capital by 1966. Two days before Independence Day in 1965, members of the Samyukta Socialist Party overpowered two constables guarding the site, covered the statue in tar and defaced its imperial crown, nose and one ear, also leaving a photo of Subhas Chandra Bose at the monument. Despite the resulting adverse publicity and the growing controversy over the situation, the matter of relocating the statue dragged on for several years. The British government rejected a proposal to repatriate the monument to the United Kingdom, citing the lack of an appropriate site and sufficient funds, while the British High Commission in New Delhi declined to have the statue relocated to their compound, due to limited space. Efforts to move the statue to a Delhi park were strongly opposed by the nationalist Bharatiya Jana Sangh, which then held power in the city. Finally, in late 1968, the statue was removed from its position beneath the canopy and briefly placed in storage before being moved to Delhi's Coronation Park, where it joined other British Raj-era statues. During and after the statue's removal, it was often suggested that a statue of Mahatma Gandhi be placed under the canopy. The suggestion was even discussed in the Indian Parliament. In 1981, the government had in response to a question in the Parliament, confirmed that it was considering the installation of a Gandhi statue under the empty canopy, but nothing came of it.

Subhas Chandra Bose statue 

On 21 January 2022, Prime Minister Narendra Modi announced that a statue of Subhas Chandra Bose would be installed in the canopy at India Gate. The announcement came two days before the 125th anniversary of his birth. A 28 feet high and 6 feet wide 3D holographic statue of Bose was inaugurated at the site on 23 January 2022, celebrated as Parakram Diwas (Courage Day). On this occasion, an award in the name of Bose was instituted for the exemplary work in disaster management. On 8 September 2022, Prime Minister Narendra Modi inaugurated the newly-made statue of Netaji Subhas Chandra Bose near the India Gate.

Amar Jawan Jyoti 

Amar Jawan Jyoti, or the flame of the immortal soldier, is a structure consisting of black marble plinth, with reversed rifle, capped by war helmet, bound by four urns, each with the permanent light (jyoti) from compressed natural gas flames, erected under the India gate to commemorate Indian soldiers martyred in the war of the liberation of Bangladesh in December 1971. It was inaugurated by the then Prime Minister Indira Gandhi on 26 January 1972, the twenty-third Indian Republic Day. 

Since the installation of the Amar Jawan Jyoti, it has served as India's tomb of the unknown soldier. It is staffed around the clock by the Indian armed forces. Wreaths are placed at the Amar Jawan Jyoti every Republic Day, Vijay Diwas, and Infantry Day by the Prime Minister and the Chiefs of the Armed Forces.

On 21 January 2022 the Amar Jawan Jyoti at India Gate was merged with the Amar Jawan Jyoti at the National War Memorial.

National War Memorial 

In July 2014, the government announced plans to construct a National War Memorial in the C-Hexagon (India Gate Circle), and an adjoining National War Museum. The cabinet allocated  for the project. The National War Memorial was completed in January, 2019. Since January 2022, it houses the Amar Jawan Jyoti, or the "Flame of the Immortal Soldier".

Gallery

See also 

 Gateway of India
 Neuve-Chapelle Indian Memorial
 Delhi War Cemetery

References 
Notes

Citations

Bibliography

External links 
 

Tourist attractions in Delhi
Gates of Delhi
Monuments and memorials in Delhi
Buildings and structures in New Delhi
Triumphal arches in India
Gates in India
World War I memorials in India
Terminating vistas
Indian military memorials and cemeteries
Military of India
Cultural infrastructure completed in 1931
Works of Edwin Lutyens in India
War memorials by Edwin Lutyens
Commonwealth War Graves Commission memorials
Road junctions in India
Squares in India